Parallel society  refers to the self-organization of an ethnic or religious minority, often but not always immigrant groups, with the intent of a reduced or minimal spatial, social and cultural contact with the majority society into which they immigrate.

The term was introduced into the debate about migration and integration in the early 1990s by the German sociologist Wilhelm Heitmeyer. It rose to prominence in the European public discourse following the murder of Dutch director and critic of Islam Theo van Gogh. In 2004, it was elected by the Association for the German Language second as Word of the year.

See also 
 Pillarisation
 Multiculturalism
 Leitkultur
 Auto-segregation
 Ghetto
 Parallel Polis, the deliberate creation of a parallel society to overcome oppressive systems
 Sensitive urban zone (France)
 Particularly vulnerable public housing area (Denmark)
 Vulnerable area (Sweden)

References 

German words and phrases
Identity politics
Multiculturalism
Society